Michel Hofman serves as the Chief of Defence of the Belgian Armed Forces since 10 July 2020. Prior to his post, he served as the Vice Chief of Defence.

Education and Background
Hofman finished high school at the Royal Cadet School at Brussels, before entering the Royal Military Academy in 1978 as a candidate naval officer, studying social and military sciences (118th All weapons class). He also studied at the Ecole de Guerre-Terre (formerly College Interarmées de Défense) at France in 2000.

He was assigned in several positions on board the ships of the Belgian Navy, ranging from minesweepers, mine hunters and frigates. From 1991 and 1997, 
he served at the Operations School of the Belgian Navy in Bruges, and later on board the M917 Crocus, where he took part in the operations during the Gulf War, and the F911 Westdiep. He also served at the Standing NATO Maritime Group 1 (STANAVFORLANT). In autumn 1997, he joined the Chief of Defence staff, Vice Admiral Herteleer.

He commanded the F911 Westdiep in 2000, and took part on the Operation Active Endeavour in response to the September 11 attacks. In 2002, he was appointed as the Chief of Staff to the Belgian-Dutch Task Group, and in January 2004, he became Deputy Operations Assistant to the Commander of the Marine Component and Deputy Chief Operations Officer at the Admiral Benelux.

In 2006, he became the Deputy Officer and the Commander of the Operations Division within the Operations & Training Department of the Defence Staff.

In 2010, he served as a Deputy Commander to French Command during the Operation Atalanta, and later served as the Commander of the Belgian Navy and also became the Deputy Admiral Benelux. In May 2015 he served again at the Operations & Training Department of the Defence Staff, first as the Deputy Operations Officer and later as the Head of the Department. He was promoted to Vice Admiral on 26 June 2016. He was appointed as Vice Chief of Defense in July 2017.

On July 10, 2020, he was named as the new Chief of Defence, replacing General Marc Compernol.

Awards
  Commander, Order of Leopold
  Order of the Crown
  Commander, Order of Leopold II
  First Class, Military Cross
  Commemorative Medal for Foreign Operations or Missions
  Meritorious Service Medal
  NATO Medal

Personal life
He currently lives at the coastal town Ostend, Belgium, and speaks fluent Dutch and French.

References

Living people
Belgian admirals
20th-century Danish military personnel
21st-century Danish military personnel
Year of birth missing (living people)